Jonathan Marray and Jamie Murray were the defending champions but decided not to participate.
Mikhail Elgin and Nikolaus Moser won the title, defeating Wu Di and Zhang Ze 6–0, 6–4 in the finals.

Seeds
The top two seeds received a bye into the first round.

  Sadik Kadir /  Purav Raja (semifinals)
  Mikhail Elgin /  Nikolaus Moser
  Hiroki Kondo /  Junn Mitsuhashi (first round)
  Samuel Groth /  Alexey Kedryuk (quarterfinals)

Draw

Draw

External links
 Main Draw

Astana Cup - Doubles
2010 Doubles